

Incumbents
President: Boris Tadić
Prime Minister: Vojislav Koštunica

Events
5 June – Serbia becomes an independent country for the first time since 1918, following the dissolution of Serbia and Montenegro after Montenegro's secession from the country a couple of days earlier.

References

 
2000s in Serbia
Years of the 21st century in Serbia
Serbia
Serbia